Bryan Dale Harsin (born November 1, 1976) is an  American football coach who was most recently the head coach for the Auburn University Tigers. Prior to leading the Auburn Tigers, he coached the Boise State University Broncos from the 2014 season through the 2020 season where he posted a 69–19 overall record while at Boise. He began his head coaching career at Arkansas State University for the 2013 season. Harsin was the co-offensive coordinator at the University of Texas for two seasons where he played a major impact in the teams development on that side. Before leaving for Texas in 2011, Harsin was an assistant at Boise State for 10 seasons, the last five as offensive coordinator and quarterbacks coach.

From Boise, Idaho, Harsin is a graduate of Boise's Capital High School, and a former quarterback at Boise State. He was the first alumnus of Boise State to serve as the Broncos head football coach.

Playing career
--Born and raised in Boise, Harsin graduated from Capital High School and was a quarterback at Boise State University from 1995 to 1999, where he was a three-year letterman and earned a bachelor's degree in Business Management in 2000.

Coaching career

Eastern Oregon
Harsin got his start at Eastern Oregon University in La Grande, coaching running backs and quarterbacks in the 2000 season.

Boise State
In 2001, he returned to Boise State as a graduate assistant under first year coach Dan Hawkins. Harsin was hired as tight ends coach in 2002 and remained in that position through 2005. During this period the Broncos led the nation in scoring twice and remained in the top 10 scoring offenses all four years. In 2005, four Broncos tight ends combined to catch 27 passes for 298 yards and three touchdowns.

When Hawkins left BSU for Colorado, offensive coordinator Chris Petersen was promoted to head coach for the 2006 season. Harsin was moved up to offensive coordinator and quarterbacks coach, and guided the Broncos offense to an undefeated season. Running back Ian Johnson rushed for 1,713 yards and led the nation in rushing touchdowns and scoring. In 2008, Kellen Moore took over the quarterback position and under Harsin's guidance earned WAC Freshman of the Year honors, completing an NCAA freshman record 69.4 completion percentage (281–405) with 25 touchdown passes and only 10 interceptions.

During Harsin's tenure as offensive coordinator, Boise State posted a 61–5 record, which included two undefeated seasons and two Fiesta Bowl victories, over Oklahoma (2007) and TCU (2010).

Texas

After the 2010 season, Harsin moved to the University of Texas in Austin for the 2011 and 2012 seasons and was the primary play-caller for the Longhorns, paired with Major Applewhite as co-offensive coordinators.  During this time he also served as quarterbacks coach for the Longhorns.

Arkansas State
Harsin became the 29th head coach at Arkansas State University in Jonesboro on December 12, 2012, succeeding Gus Malzahn, who left for Auburn after just one season.  Because Malzahn and his predecessor Hugh Freeze left after just one season in Jonesboro, Harsin's contract at Arkansas State included a $1.75 million buyout clause.

Harsin led the Red Wolves to a 7–5 record in 2013 and a share of the Sun Belt Conference title with a 5–2 record. They earned a berth in the GoDaddy Bowl against Ball State University on January 5.

Return to Boise State
Harsin returned to Boise State as head coach on December 11, 2013. He replaced his mentor Petersen, who left for the University of Washington in Seattle. In his first season at helm, he had led his team to winning the Mountain West Championship against Fresno State 28–14, and earned a spot in the Fiesta Bowl vs Arizona. The Broncos went on to win the Fiesta Bowl  38–30 and Harsin won 12 games in his first season. Harsin led the Broncos to 10+ wins in 5 out of his 7 seasons.

Auburn
Harsin was hired on December 22, 2020, as the 27th head coach of the Auburn Tigers, taking over after the termination of Gus Malzahn. His salary was $5.25 million. In his inaugural season with the Tigers, Harsin went 6–7, the team's worst record since 2012. Following the season, Harsin fired offensive coordinator Mike Bobo and hired former Seattle Seahawks quarterback coach, Austin Davis, to replace Bobo before losing Davis just six weeks later due to personal reasons. Harsin also lost defensive coordinator Derek Mason to Oklahoma State where Mason took the same role for less money. In addition to the coordinatoring changeovers, twenty players left the program including starting quarterback Bo Nix.

Following the loss of players and coaches, as well as rumors that began circulating in February 2022, Auburn began to collect information to understand any issues surrounding the football program. Harsin told ESPN that "I'm not planning on going anywhere". Multiple players, current and former, came out in support of and in opposition to Harsin. In the end, Auburn decided to retain Harsin as head coach. Harsin would later, in July 2022, describe the situation this way: "There was an inquiry. It was uncomfortable. It was unfounded. It presented an opportunity for people to personally attack me, my family and also our program. And it didn't work."

Harsin was fired as Auburn's head coach on Monday, October 31, 2022, following a 3-5 start to the season. He finished with a 9-12 record and recorded the lowest win percentage by an Auburn head coach since Earl Brown (1948-1950).

Head coaching record

* Departed Arkansas State for Boise State before bowl game

Notes

References

External links
 Auburn profile
 Boise State profile

1976 births
Living people
American football quarterbacks
Arkansas State Red Wolves football coaches
Auburn Tigers football coaches
Boise State Broncos football coaches
Boise State Broncos football players
Eastern Oregon Mountaineers football coaches
Texas Longhorns football coaches
Sportspeople from Boise, Idaho
Capital High School (Boise, Idaho) alumni
Coaches of American football from Idaho
Players of American football from Idaho